The Aachen tramway network was the backbone of public transport in Aachen, now in the federal state of North Rhine-Westphalia, Germany, and the surrounding areas from 1880 to 1974.

At times, the network also extended into Belgium and the Netherlands. In 1914, it was the fourth largest tramway network in Germany. Also, it was one of the most extensive German interurban networks. In 1974, the last tramway in the network was closed.

The network was operated from 1880 by the  Aachener und Burtscheider Pferdeeisenbahn-Gesellschaft (in English: Aachen and Burtscheid Horse Railway Company), which in 1894 became the Aachener Kleinbahn-Gesellschaft (AKG, in English: Aachen Light Railway Company). In 1942 the name was changed to Aachener Straßenbahn und Energieversorgungs-AG (ASEAG, in English: Aachen Tramway and Power Company). It is now a bus company, but the company name still refers to trams.

See also
List of town tramway systems in Germany
Trams in Germany

References

External links

 

Aachen
History of Aachen
1880 establishments in Germany
1974 disestablishments in Germany